Xamindele Airport is a public use airstrip serving the village of Toto in Uíge Province, Angola.

See also

 List of airports in Angola
 Transport in Angola

References

External links 
 OurAirports - Toto
 Toto Airport
 HERE/Nokia Maps - Xamindele

Airports in Angola
Uíge Province